Arcadia Township is the name of several places in the U.S. state of Michigan:

 Arcadia Township, Lapeer County, Michigan
 Arcadia Township, Manistee County, Michigan
 Arcadia Township, Kalamazoo County, Michigan, the former name of Kalamazoo Township until 1836

See also 
Arcadia Township (disambiguation)
 Arcada Township, Michigan

Michigan township disambiguation pages